Gëzim Tafa (born in Kavajë) is an Albanian publisher and is currently the president of the "Ombra GVG" publishing house.

References

Publishers from Kavajë
Living people
Albanian publishers (people)
Year of birth missing (living people)